Jo Myong-lok (12 July 1928 – 6 November 2010) was a North Korean military officer who held the military rank Chasu (Vice Marshal). In 1998, he was appointed First Vice-Chairman of the National Defence Commission of North Korea, Director of the Korean People's Army General Political Bureau. Previously, he was the commander of the air defence forces.

Life and career
Jo was born in Yonsa County, North Hamgyong province, on 12 July 1928 and he joined the Korean People's Army in December 1950. He was a graduate of the Manchuria Aviation School and Soviet Air Academy.

After serving as a pilot in the Korean War, Jo was promoted to major general in 1954 and lieutenant general in 1976. Meanwhile, he held other important posts, such as commanding officer of Pyongyang's Air Defence Command (1975–1977), and commanding officer of the Korean People's Army Air and Anti-Air Force from 1977 to 1995. At the 6th Party Congress in 1980, Jo Myong-rok was elected both member of the 6th Central Committee of the Workers' Party of Korea (he was elected an alternate member of the 5th Central Committee in 1975) and the 6th Central Military Commission. In 1992 he was promoted to general; in 1994 he was part of Kim Il-sung's funeral committee; in 1995 he was promoted to Vice Marshal and director of the KPA General Political Bureau.

He made a key speech commemorating the third anniversary of Kim Il-sung's death in special ceremonies on 8 July 1997. By 1998, when he was also appointed to the position of First Vice Chairman of the National Defence Commission, he was the second most powerful person in the country, ranking immediately beneath Kim Jong-il himself. In 2000, he traveled to Washington, D.C. on a goodwill mission. During the visit, he met with President Bill Clinton, his counterpart William Cohen, and Secretary of State Madeleine Albright. He was the first North Korean official to visit the White House or meet a President of the United States. The Clinton administration reciprocated by sending Albright to Pyongyang one week later to meet Kim Jong-il.

Death
On 6 November 2010, Jo died of a heart attack at the age of 82, one month after he was elected as member of the Presidium of the Political Bureau. His funeral committee was chaired by Kim Jong-il and attended by more than a hundred political and military figures, including Kim Jong-un and Supreme People's Assembly President Kim Yong-nam. He lay in state in the Central Workers' Hall (home of the General Federation of Trade Unions of Korea) in Pyongyang and was buried in the Patriotic Martyrs' Cemetery.

Against expectations, his successor was not elected at the 4th Session of the 12th Supreme People's Assembly in April 2011. There was speculation that Kim Jong-il was deliberately leaving the post vacant in order to promote his son, Kim Jong-un, when he was ready.

Funeral committee members
Jo's funeral committee consisted of:

 Kim Jong-il
 Kim Jong-un
 Kim Yong-nam
 Choe Yong-rim
 Ri Yong-ho
 Kim Yong-chun
 Jon Pyong-ho
 Kim Kuk-thae
 Kim Ki-nam
 Choe Thae-bok
 Yang Hyong-sop
 Kang Sok-ju
 Pyon Yong-rip
 Ri Yong-mu
 Ju Sang-song
 Hong Sok-hyong
 Kim Kyong-hui
 Kim Yang-gon
 Kim Yong-il
 Pak To-chun
 Choe Ryong-hae
 Jang Song-thaek
 Ju Kyu-chang
 Ri Thae-nam
 Kim Rak-hui
 Thae Jong-su
 Kim Phyong-hae
 U Tong-chuk
 Kim Jong-gak
 
 Kim Chang-sop
 Mun Kyong-dok
 Kim Myong-guk
 Kim Kyong-ok
 Kim Won-hong
 Jong Myong-do
 Ri Pyong-chol
 Choe Pu-il
 Kim Yong-chol
 Yun Jong-rin
 Choe Sang-ryo
 Choe Kyong-song
 O Kuk-ryol
 Paek Se-bong
 Hyon Chol-hae
 Ri Myong-su
 Kim Chol-man
 Ri Ul-sol
 Ri Jong-san
 Jon Jae-son
 Ri Ha-il
 Jong Chang-ryol
 Kim Yun-sim
 Han Tong-gun
 Jo Kyong-chol
 Pak Jae-gyong
 Pyon In-son
 Kim U-ho
 Kim Thaek-ku
 Choe Se-kwan
 Jong Ho-kyun
 Jon Chang-bok
 O Kum-chol
 Kim Myong-hwan
 Kim Chol
 Kim Su-hak
 Kim In-sik
 Sim Sang-dae
 Tong Yong-il
 Ri Pyong-sam
 Kim Song-dok
 Ri Chang-han
 Ro Hung-se
 Ri Tu-song
 Im Jong-chun
 Kang Phyo-yong
 Kim Hyong-ryong
 Kim Kyok-sik
 Ri Yong-hwan
 Kim Chun-sam
 Ri Yong-gil
 Han Chang-sun
 Hyon Yong-chol
 Yang Tong-hun
 Ri Pong-juk
 Pak Sung-won
 Ri Chun-il
 Ri Thae-sop
 Kim Song-chol
 Jo Song-hwan
 Pak Kwang-chol
 Yun Kyong-so
 Yang In-guk
 Ri Hi-su
 Ri Chol
 O Chol-san
 Son Chong-nam
 Hwang Hong-sik
 Kang Phil-hun
 Kim Chang-su
 Ri Yong-min
 Pak Yong-rae
 Pak Yong-sik
 Kim Su-gil
 Rim Jong-hwan
 Kim Kyong-chan
 Kim Tong-hwa
 Choe Jae-bok
 Kim Yong-nam
 Ri Jong-rae
 Ju Tong-chol
 Kim Sung-guk
 Ju Sung-nam
 Jong Un-hak
 Cha Myong-song
 Hyon Pyong-mu
 Kim To-un
 Ri Sung-ho
 Pang Chun-san
 Son Chol-ju
 Jon Ha-chol
 Ro Tu-chol
 Pak Su-gil
 Jo Pyong-ju
 Han Kwang-bok
 Kim Yong-dae
 Ryu Mi-yong
 Ri Yong-su
 Choe Hui-jong
 O Il-jong
 Kim Jong-im
 Chae Hui-jong
 Ri Jae-il
 Ri Ryong-ha
 Pak Pong-ju
 Jon Il-chun
 Kim Tong-il
 Han Kwang-sang
 Jong Myong-hak
 Kim Tong-i
 Hong In-pom
 Kang Yang-mo
 Ri Man-gon
 Ro Pae-kwon
 Pak Thae-dok
 Ju Yong-sik
 O Su-yong
 Kwak Pom-ki
 Kim Hi-thaek
 Rim Kyong-man
 Paek Kye-ryong
 Pak Ui-chun
 Kim Hyong-sik
 Kim Thae-bong
 Jon Kil-su
 Ri Mu-yong
 An Jong-su
 Ri Ryong-nam
 Kim Yong-chin
 Ryu Yong-sop
 Pak Myong-chol
 Jang Chol
 Kim Ki-ryong
 
 Cha Sung-su
 Kim Jong-suk
 Ri Yong-chol
 Kim Pyong-ryul
 Jang Pyong-kyu
 Ryang Man-gil
 Song Cha-rip

References

External links
Jo Myong-rok, Envoy to U.S From North Korea, Dies at 82

|-

|-

|-

|-

|-

1928 births
2010 deaths
People from North Hamgyong
North Korean military personnel
National Heroes of North Korea
Members of the 6th Presidium of the Workers' Party of Korea